Artaxa angulata is a moth of the family Erebidae first described by Shōnen Matsumura in 1927. It is found in Taiwan, Myanmar, India, Pakistan, Sri Lanka, Malaysia, Singapore and Indonesia.

Its wingspan is about 14–20 mm. Forewings yellowish with two narrow, medially found pale yellow lines. Submarginal area with three black spots, where two of them at apex, and one near tornus.

References

Moths of Asia
Moths described in 1927